Elixir (also titled Wave #2: Elixir and Elixir: The Visionary Gateway to Celestial Realms) is a studio album by new-age musician Iasos. It was released on cassette and CD on his own label Inter-Dimensional Music in February 1983. Featuring quasi-symphonic arrangements, it is one of the more positive-sounding albums by Iasos.  AllMusic picked the album as an essential Iasos recording.

Music 
The second half of "Helios & Vesta" is a reworked version of "The Royal Court of The Goddess Vesta" from Jeweled Space (1981). "The Angels of Comfort" is a shortened version of the same-titled track on Angelic Music (1978). "*Crystal*White*Fire*Light*" was previously released on Crystal Love (1979) and "The Descent of Spring" was released on Essence of Spring, also in 1983.

Track listing

References

External links
 
 Album at Bandcamp.com

1983 albums
Iasos (musician) albums